Edgar Allen Diddle (March 12, 1895 – January 2, 1970) was an American college men's basketball coach. He is known for coaching at Western Kentucky University in Bowling Green, Kentucky from 1922 to 1964. Diddle became the first coach in history to coach 1,000 games at one school. Diddle was known as one of the early pioneers of the fast break and for waving a red towel around along the sidelines. During games he would wave, toss, and chew on this towel, and even cover his face in times of disappointment. His red towel is now part of WKU's official athletic logo. Diddle experienced only five losing seasons in 42 years.

Early life
He was born near Gradyville, Kentucky.  Diddle played basketball and football for Centre College and was a member of their 1919 undefeated basketball team and 1919 undefeated football team. He was a halfback on the football team. After college, he coached basketball at Monticello High School, where he guided the team to the Kentucky State Tournament semi-finals, and then Greenville High School, which played in a regional tournament at Bowling Green. During the tournament, he came to the attention of officials at Western Kentucky who offered him the coaching position at the college.

Career at Western Kentucky
He became Western Kentucky Hilltoppers basketball coach in 1922. Diddle's Western Kentucky teams claimed 32 conference championships; played in 13 national postseason tournaments (an impressive total considering that there was no national tournament for the first 15 years of his tenure); won 20+ games eighteen different times (including 10 consecutive); became the first team from the South to participate in the Olympic Trials; the first Kentucky team to play in the NCAA tournament and National Invitation Tournament; and were nationally ranked numerous times. In 1942 he led the Hilltoppers to the national championship game.  His 1948 team finished 3rd nationally and the 1954 team finished 4th. Diddle's teams led the NCAA in victories six seasons and had the highest winning percentage in 1948.  When he retired in 1964, he had won a then record 759 games.

While Diddle was best known for coaching men's basketball, he also coached football (1922–1928), baseball (1923–1957) and women's basketball at Western.

Legacy

Diddle was responsible for breaking a color barrier at the college when he recruited the first African American basketball players, Clem Haskins and Dwight Smith, in the early 1960s.

E. A. Diddle Arena, the basketball venue at WKU, built in 1963, is named for him. For the last six years of his life, Diddle was a fixture at the arena, even leading cheers. During a 1968 game against Dayton, he jumped on top of a press table to lead the students in cheers. When a Dayton sportswriter told him to get down, Diddle snapped, "What do you mean I can't get on top of this table? This is my damn gym!".

Hall of Fame
Coach Diddle has been inducted into the Kentucky Sports Hall of Fame, The Naismith Memorial Basketball Hall of Fame, the Western Kentucky University Athletic Hall of Fame, the Centre College Athletic Hall of Fame, and National Collegiate Basketball Hall of Fame.

Head coaching record

Men's basketball

Baseball

Football

Women's basketball

See also
 List of college men's basketball coaches with 600 wins

References

External links
 
 

1895 births
1970 deaths
American football halfbacks
American men's basketball coaches
American men's basketball players
Baseball coaches from Kentucky
Basketball coaches from Kentucky
Basketball players from Kentucky
Centre Colonels football players
College men's basketball head coaches in the United States
College men's basketball players in the United States
High school basketball coaches in the United States
Naismith Memorial Basketball Hall of Fame inductees
National Collegiate Basketball Hall of Fame inductees
People from Adair County, Kentucky
Players of American football from Kentucky
Sportspeople from Bowling Green, Kentucky
Western Kentucky Hilltoppers and Lady Toppers athletic directors
Western Kentucky Hilltoppers baseball coaches
Western Kentucky Hilltoppers basketball coaches
Western Kentucky Hilltoppers football coaches
Western Kentucky Lady Toppers basketball coaches